Minnie Tracey ( - January 29, 1929) was an American high lyric soprano.

Early years
Tracey was born in Albany, New York. She studied music abroad, including three years' training under Belgian operatic soprano Marie Sasse.

Career 
In 1890, Tracey debuted in the Geneva Opera House in the role of Marguerite in Faust. She received several curtain calls, and "Her success was unprecedented in the case of a debutante in Geneva." She created roles in some operas written by her friend Jules Massenet, and she sang with Caruso in London. Other cities in which she performed included Bordeaux, Marseilles, Milan, Nice, and Paris.

Civic contributions 
While Tracey lived in Cincinnati, she "was a dominant factor in the city's artistic life." Her contributions included arranging a Mozart festival and achieving radio broadcasts of the Cincinnati Symphony Orchestra.

Death
On January 29, 1929, Tracey died at her home in Cincinnati, Ohio, at age 55. The following Sunday, a music column in The Cincinnati Enquirer praised her contributions as a music educator and "impresario of musical events".

References 

1929 deaths
19th-century American women singers
19th-century American singers
20th-century American women singers
20th-century American singers
20th-century women musicians